Susudata was a placename pointed out in Ptolemy's atlas Geographia which is dated 150 AD. The word itself is a derivation from the Germanic term "Susutin". For a long time the place could not be positively identified, due to Ptolemy's variances. It was assumed to be in the vicinity of Berlin and could recently be located by an expedition led by Andreas Kleineberg, which confirmed the site at Fürstenwalde, Germany.

Literature 
 Andreas Kleineberg, Christian Marx, Eberhard Knobloch, Dieter Lelgemann: Germania und die Insel Thule.Die Entschlüsselung von Ptolemaios' "Atlas der Oikumene".Wissenschaftl. Buchgesell.,2010.
 Claudius Ptolemäus: Geographia, Ed. C. F. A. Nobbe cum introd. Aubrey Diller, Hildesheim 1966.
 Achim Leube: Die römische Kaiserzeit im Oder-Spree-Gebiet, Berlin(Ost) 1975.

Footnotes

External links  
 spiegel online

Names of places in Europe
Settlements in Germania Magna